Speckmann or Speckman is a German surname, which is a habitational name for a person who lived near a swamp or specke in Middle Low German, or a locational surname for a person from German villages named Specke or Specken. The name may refer to:

Bettina Speckmann (born 1972), German computer scientist, daughter of Erwin-Josef
Erwin-Josef Speckmann (born 1939), German neuroscientist, father of Bettina
Mark Speckman (born 1955), American football coach
Paul Speckmann (born 1963), American musician
Rosko Specman (born 1989), South African rugby player

References

German-language surnames